Warrant is a 1975 Hindi-language film directed by Pramod Chakravorty. The film stars Dev Anand, Zeenat Aman, Pran, Dara Singh, Ajit Khan, Lalita Pawar and Joginder. The soundtrack is by the Indian music director R. D. Burman. It was a success at the box office.

Plot 
During a jail riot instigated by jailed convict Jaggu (Joginder), the Jailer, Arun Mehra's (Dev Anand) life is threatened, and another convict Dinesh (Satish Kaul), risks his life to save Arun. Arun and his mom, Mrs. Mehra (Sulochana) find out that Dinesh is on death-row for killing noted Professor Ashok Verma. Arun does not believe that Dinesh is guilty, and so he arranges his escape and as a result he has not only the police, including his very own dad, Inspector General of Police Mehra (Pran) after him on a manhunt, but also underworld don Master (Ajit Khan) and his men; and a cold-hearted female assassin (Zeenat Aman) who has reserved just two bullets in her gun for Arun and Dinesh.

Cast 
 Dev Anand as Jailor Arun Mehra
 Zeenat Aman as Rita Verma
 Pran as IG Mehra
 Ajit Khan as Master
Sujit Kumar as Thompson 
 Dara Singh as Pyaara Singh
 Seema Kapoor as Guddo- Pyaara's sister
 Satish Kaul as Dinesh
 Arpana Choudhary as Rekha- Dinesh's sister

Facts 
 Pran who acts as father of Dev Anand in the movie is only three years older than Dev Anand in real life; Pran was born in 1920 and Dev Anand in 1923.
 Pran had earlier also acted as Dev Anand's brother in the 1970 film Johny Mera Naam.

Soundtrack 
All the songs were composed by Rahul Dev Burman and lyrics were penned by Anand Bakshi.

The movie's songs are all very melodious. Two of them are "Ruk Ruk Jana O Jaana Humse Do Baate Karke Chali Jaana" and "Sun Bhai Baaraati", both sung by Kishore Kumar.

References

External links 
 

Films scored by R. D. Burman
1975 films
1970s Hindi-language films
Films directed by Pramod Chakravorty